Bernard Émond (born 1951) is a Canadian director, screenwriter, novelist and essayist working in the French-language. He studied anthropology at university and lived for several years in the Canadian north where he worked for the Inuit Broadcasting Corporation. He began his film career making documentaries, later moving to feature-length films, all of which have been shot in Quebec. He is noted for the humanistic, sometimes spiritual depth of his films, in particular his trilogy of feature films (2007, 2009, 2012) based on the three Christian virtues, faith, hope, and charity. Other themes in his work include human dignity and frailty, and cultural loss. He describes himself as an agnostic and a "conservative socialist."

Bernard Émond is married to Catherine Martin, also a Quebec film director. They live in Montreal.

Filmography

Director and writer
 1992 : Ceux qui ont le pas léger meurent sans laisser de traces
 1994 : L'instant et la patience
 1995 : La Terre des autres
 1997 : L'épreuve du feu
 2000 : Le Temps et le lieu
 2001 : The Woman Who Drinks (La Femme qui boit)
 2003 : 8:17 p.m. Darling Street (20h17 rue Darling)
 2005 : The Novena (La Neuvaine)
 2007 : Summit Circle (Contre toute espérance)
 2009 : The Legacy (La Donation)
 2012 : All That You Possess (Tout ce que tu possèdes)
 2015 : The Diary of an Old Man (Journal d'un vieil homme)
 2018 : A Place to Live (Pour vivre ici)

Producer 
 1994 : Octobre (October)

Awards and recognition
 2009: Youth Jury Special Award and Environment is Quality of Life Award, Don Quixote Award, Locarno International Film Festival, The Legacy (La Donation; nomination, Golden Leopard.
 2009: Genie Award for Best Screenplay, Original, The Necessities of Life (Ce qu'il faut pour vivre); Jutra Award, Best Screenplay
 2008, Nomination, Jutra Award for Best Direction and Best Screenplay, Summit Circle (Contre toute espérance)
 2006, Nomination, Jutra Award for Best Direction and Best Screenplay, The Novena (La Neuvaine)
 2005: Prize of the Ecumenical Jury and Youth Jury Award: Environment is Quality of Life of the Locarno International Film Festival, The Novena (La Neuvaine); Nomination, Golden Leopard
 2002: Nomination, Genie Award for Best Achievement in Direction, The Woman Who Drinks (La Femme qui boit)
 2001: Nomination, Golden Bayard, Namur International Film Festival, The Woman Who Drinks (La Femme qui boit)

Publications
 20h17 rue Darling, Montréal, (Québec), Canada, Lux Éditeur, 2005, 128 p.. English translation by John Gilmore, 8:17 pm, rue Darling, Toronto, (Ontario), Canada, Guernica Editions, 2014, 133 p.
 Aani la bavarde, avec Fabien Merelle, Namur, Belgique, Éditions Didier Hatier, 2007, 77 p.
 Aani la bavarde, PLAYBAC (March 29, 1999), French, 
 La Neuvaine : Scénario et regards croisés, Montréal, (Québec), Canada, Éditions Les 400 coups, 2008
 Il y a trop d'images : Textes épars 1993–2010, Montréal, (Québec), Canada, Lux Éditeur, 2011, 123 p.
 Tout ce que tu possèdes : Scénario et regards croisés, Montréal, (Québec), Canada, Lux Éditeur, 2012, 144 p.
 Camarade, ferme ton poste : Et autres textes, Montréal, (Québec), Canada, Lux Éditeur, 2017, 160 p.

References

External links
 Official website

Biography at Coop Video of Montreal (English)
 Bernard Émond at the National Film Board of Canada

1951 births
Best Screenplay Genie and Canadian Screen Award winners
French Quebecers
Living people
Film directors from Montreal
Date of birth missing (living people)
Film producers from Quebec